Paula Anne Gallant (December 5, 1969 – December 27, 2005) was a Canadian school teacher who was murdered by asphyxiation due to strangulation. On December 27, 2005, Gallant and her husband, Jason MacRae were in their basement arguing about a debt from online gambling. After MacRae walked back down to the basement where Gallant was sitting at the computer, he hit her in the back of her head with a two-by-four wood board. He then proceeded to strangle her to the floor until she stopped moving and then wrapped her head with Saran Wrap to make sure she was dead.

Early life and education
Gallant was a grade three teacher at Beechville Lakeside Timberlea School. Gallant was actively involved in her school and community, and art was one of her passions. She was pursuing her Certificate in Visual Arts at NSCAD.

Disappearance
On December 27, 2005, shortly after 7:00PM her husband had contacted his wife's sister Lana Kenny to see if she knew of her whereabouts. At their house 45 minutes later MacRae contacted the Halifax Regional Police reporting that Gallant had not returned from Costco, since 2:00PM.

Searches
Family and friends searched the community and called friends and neighbors trying to locate Gallant. At 12:30 a.m.  on December 28, 2005, Gallant's car was located at the Beachville-Lakeside-Timberlea School where she taught a Grade 3 art class. The car was locked and her body was found in the trunk of her green 1997 Chevrolet Cavalier. She was wrapped in a blanket in a fetal position.

Media coverage
Gallant's murder was covered locally and nationally throughout Canada. The family and MacRae were interviewed and profiled by The National and The Fifth Estate, in 2006. Her death was one of Nova Scotia's most high-profile unsolved homicides.

Memorials
The Paula Gallant Memorial Fund donated money to the Transition House Association of Nova Scotia. With the permission of Gallant's family, the Paula Gallant Modified Art Therapy Project for Survivors of Violence and Abuse was developed. Over 300 woman each year participate in the project.
A children's book was written in her memory titled "Miss Gallant’s Favourite Season", by author Louise Christie
On October 10, 2007, Gallant's sister street was named in her memory.
The community of Timberlea, Nova Scotia has a memorial walk in Gallant's Memory, which began June 27, 2007, called "A Walk to Remember"
The art room at Ecole Beechville Lakeside Timberlea Elementary School was redone to recognize and remember Paula Gallant, and how she shared her passion for art with all of the schools students.

References

External links
 Paula Gallant
 Last Wire Podcast

1969 births
Missing person cases in Canada
2000s missing person cases
People murdered in Nova Scotia
2005 deaths